Aflibercept, sold under the brand names Eylea and Zaltrap, is a medication used to treat wet macular degeneration and metastatic colorectal cancer. It was developed by Regeneron Pharmaceuticals and is approved in the United States and the European Union.

It is an inhibitor of vascular endothelial growth factor (VEGF).

Medical uses
Aflibercept (Eylea) is indicated for the treatment of people with neovascular (wet) age-related macular degeneration, macular edema following retinal vein occlusion, diabetic macular edema, diabetic retinopathy, and retinopathy of prematurity.

Aflibercept (Zaltrap), in combination with fluorouracil, leucovorin, irinotecan (FOLFIRI), is indicated for the treatment of people with metastatic colorectal cancer that is resistant to or has progressed following an oxaliplatin-containing regimen.

It is used for the treatment of wet macular degeneration and is administered as an intravitreal injection, that is, into the eye. For cancer treatment, it is given intravenously in combination with fluorouracil, leucovorin, and irinotecan (FOLFIRI).

In August 2014, aflibercept (Eylea) was approved for the treatment of people with visual impairment due to diabetic macular edema, according to the updated summary of product characteristics. In May 2019 FDA expanded the indication for aflibercept to include all stages of diabetic retinopathy.

In February 2023, the US FDA approved aflibercept (Eylea) as a treatment for retinopathy of prematurity (ROP), the infant version of diabetic retinopathy.

Contraindications
Aflibercept (Eylea) is contraindicated in people with infections or active inflammations of or near the eye, while Aflibercept (Zaltrap) has no contraindications.

Adverse effects
Common adverse effects of the eye formulation include conjunctival hemorrhage, eye pain, cataract, vitreous detachment, floaters, and ocular hypertension.

Aflibercept (Zaltrap) has adverse effects typical of anti-cancer drugs, such as reduced blood cell count (leukopenia, neutropenia, thrombocytopenia), gastrointestinal disorders like diarrhea and abdominal pain, and fatigue. Another common effect is hypertension (increased blood pressure).

Interactions 

No interactions are described for either formulation.

Mechanism of action
In wet macular degeneration, abnormal blood vessels grow in the choriocapillaris, a layer of capillaries in the eye, leading to blood and protein leakage below the macula.

Aflibercept binds to circulating VEGFs and acts like a "VEGF trap". It thereby inhibits the activity of the vascular endothelial growth factor subtypes VEGF-A and VEGF-B, as well as to placental growth factor (PGF), inhibiting the growth of new blood vessels in the choriocapillaris or the tumour, respectively. The aim of the cancer treatment, so to speak, is to starve the tumour.

Composition
Aflibercept is a recombinant fusion protein consisting of vascular endothelial growth factor (VEGF)-binding portions from the extracellular domains of human VEGF receptors 1 and 2, that are fused to the Fc portion of the human IgG1 immunoglobulin.

History

Regeneron commenced clinical testing of aflibercept in cancer in 2001.  In 2003, Regeneron signed a major deal with Aventis to develop aflibercept in the field of cancer.  In 2004 Regeneron started testing the compound, locally delivered, in proliferative eye diseases, and in 2006 Regeneron and Bayer signed an agreement to develop the eye indications.

Society and culture

Legal status
In November 2011, the United States Food and Drug Administration (FDA) approved aflibercept for the treatment of wet macular degeneration.

In August 2012, the FDA approved aflibercept for use in combination with 5-fluorouracil, folinic acid and irinotecan to treat adults with metastatic colorectal cancer that is resistant to or has progressed following an oxaliplatin‑containing regimen. To avoid confusion with the version that is injected into the eye, the FDA assigned a new name, ziv-aflibercept, to the active ingredient.

In November 2012, the European Medicines Agency (EMA) approved aflibercept (Eylea) for the treatment of wet macular degeneration.

In February 2013, the European Medicines Agency (EMA) approved aflibercept (Zaltrap) for the treatment of adults with metastatic colorectal cancer for whom treatment based on oxaliplatin has not worked or the cancer got worse. Aflibercept (Zaltrap) is used with FOLFIRI, which is a treatment combining the medicines irinotecan, 5-fluorouracil, and folinic acid.

Economics
In March 2015, aflibercept was one of a group of drugs delisted from the UK Cancer Drugs Fund. In 2017, injections of aflibercept (HCPCS code J0178) were responsible for the most billing to Medicare Part B, at $2.36 billion.

Research 
In March 2011, Regeneron reported that aflibercept failed its primary endpoint of overall survival in the Vital phase III trial for second-line treatment of locally advanced or metastatic non-small cell lung cancer (NSCLC), although it improved the secondary endpoint of progression-free survival.

In April 2011, Regeneron reported that aflibercept improved its primary endpoint of overall survival in the Velour phase III clinical trial for second-line treatment for metastatic colorectal cancer (mCRC).

Aflibercept was also in a phase III trial for hormone-refractory metastatic prostate cancer .

A 2016 Cochrane Review examined outcomes comparing aflibercept versus ranibizumab injections in over 2400 people with neovascular AMD, from two randomized controlled trials. Both treatment options yielded similar improvements in visual acuity and morphological outcomes, though the authors note that the aflibercept treatment regimen has the potential to reduce treatment burden other risks from injections.

A 2017 review update studying the effects of anti-VEGF drugs on diabetic macular edema found that while all three studied treatments have advantages over laser therapy, there was moderate evidence that aflibercept is significantly favored in all measured efficacy outcomes over ranibizumab and bevacizumab, after one year.

References

External links
 
 
 

Angiogenesis inhibitors
Bayer brands
Breakthrough therapy
Engineered proteins
Ophthalmology drugs
Sanofi